The 2020 FC Zhetysu season was the club's third season back in the Kazakhstan Premier League following their relegation at the end of the 2016 season, and 23rd season in total.

Season Events
On 13 March, the Football Federation of Kazakhstan announced all league fixtures would be played behind closed doors for the foreseeable future due to the COVID-19 pandemic. On 16 March the Football Federation of Kazakhstan suspended all football until 15 April.

On 26 July, it was announced that the league would resume on 1 July, with no fans being permitted to watch the games. The league was suspended for a second time on 3 July, for an initial two weeks, due to an increase in COVID-19 cases in the country.

Squad

Transfers

In

Loans in

Released

Friendlies

Competitions

Premier League

Results summary

Results by round

Results

League table

Kazakhstan Cup

Squad statistics

Appearances and goals

|-
|colspan="14"|Players away from Zhetysu on loan:
|-
|colspan="14"|Players who left Zhetysu during the season:
|}

Goal scorers

Clean sheet

Disciplinary record

References

FC Zhetysu seasons
Zhetysu